Marco Cecchinato was the defending champion but chose not to defend his title.

Hugo Dellien won the title after defeating Wu Tung-lin 5–7, 7–6(7–1), 6–1 in the final.

Seeds
All seeds receive a bye into the second round.

Draw

Finals

Top half

Section 1

Section 2

Bottom half

Section 3

Section 4

References

External links
Main draw
Qualifying draw

2019 ATP Challenger Tour
2019 Singles